Lidiia Iakovleva (born 28 August 2003) is a Russian-born Australian rhythmic gymnast who represented Australia at the 2020 Summer Olympics. She represented Australia at the 2018 Summer Youth Olympics and won a bronze medal in the mixed multi-discipline team event. She won a silver medal in the team event at the 2022 Commonwealth Games.

Early life
Lidiia Iakovleva was born in Petrozavodsk, and she began rhythmic gymnastics when she was five years old. She moved with her family to Australia when she was seven years old. She is coached by her mother, Iuliia Iakovleva, at Aspire Gymnastics Academy in Brisbane.

Career

Junior 
Iakovleva competed at the 2016 Pacific Rim Championships and won the bronze medal in clubs behind Lili Mizuno and Zhao Yating. She won the all-around at the Junior Australian Championships in 2016, 2017, and 2018. At the 2018 Youth Olympic Games, she finished twenty-third in the all-around qualification round and won the bronze medal in the mixed multi-discipline team event.

Senior 
Iakovleva became eligible for senior competition in 2019. She finished fifty-ninth in the all-around at the 2019 Pesaro World Cup. Then at the World Challenge Cup in Kazan, she finished forty-seventh in the all-around. She was selected to compete at the 2019 World Championships in Baku. The Australian team finished thirtieth, and she finished sixty-fifth in the all-around during the qualification round.

Iakovleva won the gold medal in the all-around at the 2021 Australian Championships. Then at the 2021 Oceania Championships in Gold Coast, Queensland, she won the gold medal in the all-around and received the continental quota spot for the 2020 Olympic Games. At the 2020 Olympic Games, she finished twenty-third in the qualification round for the individual all-around. Her total score of 78.775 was a personal best.

In 2022, Iakovleva was awarded with a Tier 3 scholarship for the Sport Australia Hall of Fame Scholarship and Mentoring Program. She was selected to represent Australia at the 2022 Commonwealth Games in Birmingham.

References

External links
 

2003 births
Living people
Australian rhythmic gymnasts
People from Petrozavodsk
Sportspeople from Brisbane
Gymnasts at the 2018 Summer Youth Olympics
Russian emigrants to Australia
Gymnasts at the 2020 Summer Olympics
Olympic gymnasts of Australia
Gymnasts at the 2022 Commonwealth Games
Commonwealth Games silver medallists for Australia
Commonwealth Games medallists in gymnastics
Medallists at the 2022 Commonwealth Games